Leah Robinson (born 29 May 1982) is a Canadian soccer player who last played for Australian W-League team Adelaide United.

Club career
Robinson signed for Jersey Sky Blue of the W-League in 2008.

International career

She has made five appearances for the Canadian national team, appearing in both the 2001 Algarve Cup and the 2003 Pan American Games.

References

External links

1982 births
Living people
Canadian expatriate women's soccer players
Canadian women's soccer players
Canada women's international soccer players
Damallsvenskan players
Expatriate women's footballers in Sweden
Expatriate women's soccer players in the United States
Jitex BK players
Adelaide United FC (A-League Women) players
Soccer people from Nova Scotia
Sportspeople from Halifax, Nova Scotia
USL W-League (1995–2015) players
A-League Women players
Vancouver Whitecaps FC (women) players
Virginia Commonwealth University alumni
Women's Premier Soccer League Elite players
Canadian expatriate sportspeople in Australia
Expatriate women's soccer players in Australia
VCU Rams women's soccer players
Women's association football midfielders
Canadian expatriate sportspeople in the United States
Canadian expatriate sportspeople in Sweden
Ottawa Fury (women) players